Operation Tsunami was a joint operation in 2003 between 200 Canadian forces and Afghanistan police against drug trafficking in Afghanistan.

On January 18, 2003, Operation Tsunami forces arrested sixteen suspected drug traffickers.

External links
 CBC News: Canadian soldiers seize drugs, weapons in Kabul raid

Law enforcement in Afghanistan
Canadian Armed Forces
Illegal drug trade in Afghanistan
Military operations of the War in Afghanistan (2001–2021) involving Canada